Sagirovo (Sağır) is a rural locality (a village) in Dushanbekovsky Selsoviet, Kiginsky District, Bashkortostan, Russia. The population was 277 as of 2010. There are 3 streets.

Geography 
Sagirovo is located 7 km north of Verkhniye Kigi (the district's administrative centre) by road. Kizetamak is the nearest rural locality.

References 

Rural localities in Kiginsky District